This is a list of notable Old Boys of St Patrick's College, Strathfield, they being notable former students of the independent Roman Catholic school, St Patrick's College, located in , in the inner western suburbs of Sydney, New South Wales, Australia.

Academia, science and medicine
 Professor John Michael Dwyer Australian doctor, professor of medicine, and public health advocate. Former Head of the Department of Clinical Immunology at Yale University
 John Stanley Mattick geneticist and microbiologist, former director of the Garvan Institute of Medical Research, inaugural Chief Executive Officer at Genomics England
 Michael K. Morgan professor of Neurosurgery and Dean of Medicine, School of Advanced Medicine, Macquarie University
 Chris Tinneyprofessor and Associate Dean for the Faculty of Science at UNSW, where he heads the Exoplanetary Science at UNSW group within the School of Physics. Former head of the Australian Astronomical Observatory

Bureaucracy, politics and the law
 John Brogden former NSW Liberal Leader of the Opposition and former Member for Pittwater. Current Chairman of Lifeline and Patron of Kookaburra Kids.
 John J. Brown Minister for Sport, Recreation and Tourism in the First Hawke Ministry 1983-1988.  Minister for Administrative Services until 1984 and Minister assisting the Minister for Defence 
 Tony Burke MPFederal Labor Member for Watson, Shadow Minister for Environment and Water, Shadow Minister for Citizenship and Multicultural Australia, Shadow Minister for the Arts and Manager of Opposition Business and former Member of the NSW Legislative Council
 Ralph James "Mick" CloughLabor Member of the New South Wales Legislative Assembly from 1976 to 1981, representing the electorate of Blue Mountains and representing the electorate of Bathurst from 1981 to 1988 and again from 1991 to 1999
 Bryan Doyle MPformer NSW Liberal Member for Campbelltown
 Craig Emersonformer Federal Labor Member for Rankin and minister
 Laurie Ferguson MPformer Federal Labor Member for Werriwa, former NSW Member for Granville and brother of Martin
 Martin Ferguson former Federal Member for Batman and minister and brother of Laurie
 Justin Gleeson former Solicitor-General of Australia (2013–2016), the Commonwealth's second-ranking law officer.
 Dick Healeyformer NSW Liberal Member for Davidson and Minister
 Gary Humphriesformer Liberal Chief Minister of the ACT and former Senator for the ACT
 Craig Laundy MP Former Federal Liberal Member for Reid and former Minister for Small and Family Business, the Workplace and Deregulation, former Assistant Minister for Industry, Innovation and Science, former Assistant Minister for Multicultural Affairs
 Paul Lynch MPNSW Labor Member for Liverpool and Shadow Attorney General
 Paul McLeayformer NSW Labor Member for Heathcote and Minister
 John Pierceformer Secretary of the Department and Chief Economist to The Treasury (New South Wales), former Secretary of the Department to the Australian Government Department of Resources Energy & Tourism and current Chairman of the Australian Energy Market Commission
 Kieran Prendergast former British diplomat (High Commissioner to Zimbabwe, Kenya, Ambassador to Turkey) and UN Under-Secretary-General 1997-2005
 Douglas W. Sutherland 78th Lord Mayor of Sydney

Business
 Greg Coffeya London hedge fund manager known as the "Wizard of Oz". Worth roughly US$734 million.
 Rod de Aboitizformer Chief Financial Officer of Rothschild Australia
 Peter Mattick co-founder and former interim chief executive officer of Salmat
 Phil Salterco-founder of Salmat
 John Symond Australian financial executive and founder of Aussie Home Loans

Clergy 
 Most Reverend Bede Vincent HeatherBishop Emeritus of Parramatta; former co-chairman of the Catholic/Baptist International Dialogue and first Bishop of Parramatta 1986-1997.
 Most Reverend Patrick Murphyformer Vice-President and Rector of the Post Graduate House at St Patrick's Seminary, former President of St Patrick's Seminary, former Episcopal Vicar for Education, former Chairman of the Sydney Archdiocesan Catholic Schools Board and former Chairman of the Catholic Education Commission of NSW; and the inaugural Bishop of Broken Bay 1986-1996

Entertainment, media and the arts

 Mig Ayesaactor, notable work includes "Joe" the landlord on ABC children's serial The Ferals
 Thomas Kenneally author and Australian National Living Treasure
 Rob ShehadieAustralian film and television actor whose notable works include the television show Pizza, Here Come the Habibs, Street Smart and Housos
 Peter Skrzynecki poet, writer and lecturer at the University of Western Sydney. His poems were formerly studied by year 12 students during the course of the Higher School Certificate

Sport
 John Ballestyformer Australian Rugby Union International
 Adam DoueihiAustralian rugby league footballer for the South Sydney Rabbitohs and Wests Tigers, and representative for Lebanon in the 2017 Rugby League World Cup
 Michael FoleyAustralian rugby union player, Australian rugby union forwards coach 2003–2008, New South Wales Warartahs rugby union coach 2008. Until 2016 coach of the Western Force
 Brian McCowageAustralian Foil Champion. Olympic Representative at the 1956, 1960 and 1964 Olympic Games
 Rob Shehadiea film and television actor who also represented Lebanon as a professional, international, rugby league player
 Matt Williamsprofessional rugby coach and sports commentator

See also

 List of Catholic schools in New South Wales
 Catholic education in Australia

References

External links

St Patrick's College, Strathfield
St Patrick's College, Strathfield
St Patricks Strathfield Old Boys
St Patrick's College, Strathfield
 *